Dean Murphy is an Australian screenwriter, producer and director.

Dean Murphy wrote, produced and directed his first feature, 'Just Cruising' at the age of 17, he followed this with a sitcom pilot for the Nine Network. In 1992 he wrote, produced and directed his second feature before moving to LA to write and develop projects with producer George Folsey Jr (Trading Places, Coming to America).

Dean returned to Australia in 1997 to direct his third feature and became a founding member of Instinct Entertainment. Dean went on to produce ‘Till Human Voices Wake Us’ starring Guy Pearce and Helena Bonham Carter, co-write, executive produce and direct the Paul Hogan, Michael Caton feature ‘Strange Bedfellows’, (which took $5 000 000 at the Australian box office) produce the US set thriller ‘Torn’, the children's DVD series, ‘Zokky – The Kangaroo’ and executive produce the feature documentary ‘Salute’. In 2009 Dean directed the Paul Hogan, Shane Jacobson feature ‘Charlie & Boots’, followed up by co-writing Kevin ‘Bloody’ Wilson's ‘Little Johnny’. In 2012 Dean directed the top rating ABC telemovie, ‘Cliffy’, the ABC documentary ‘Hanging with Hoges’ and has been producing live theatre including ‘Mother & Son’ starring Noeline Brown and Shane Jacobson and ‘An Evening with Hoges’ starring Aussie Icon, Paul Hogan. Dean also directed the ABC/Opera Australia project ‘The Divorce’ starring Marina Prior, Lisa McCune, Hugh Sheridan and Kate Miller Heidke.

In 2017 Dean wrote and directed 'That's Not My Dog' starring 30 of Australia's biggest stars in comedy. The film, distributed by Transmission Films, will have a theatrical release in 2018.

Credits
Just Cruising (1988) (Video Feature) - Director, Writer, Producer
Friends (1990) (TV Pilot) - Director, Writer, Producer
Lex and Rory (1994) - Producer, Writer, Director
Muggers (2000) - Director
Till Human Voices Wake Us (2002) - Producer
Strange Bedfellows (2004) - Executive Producer, Director, Writer
Salute (2008) (Feature Documentary) - Executive Producer
Zokky the Kangaroo (2009) (TV series) - Producer
Charlie and Boots (2009) - Producer, Director
The Best of Paul Hogan - 1 & 2 (2010) (TV Special) - Director
Torn (2010) - Producer
Little Johnny the Movie (2011) - Producer, Writer
Cliffy (2013) (TV Movie) - Director
Strange Bedfellows - The Musical (2014) (Musical) - Producer, Writer
Mother and Son (2014) (Stage) - Producer
Hanging with Hoges (2014) (Documentary) - Producer, Writer
Sister Soul (2015) (Stage) - Producer
The Subjects (2015) (Movie) - Producer
Hoges; One Night Only! (2015) (TV Special) - Producer
The Divorce (2015) (4 Part TV Series) - Director
That's Not My Dog! (2017) (Movie) - Writer, Director
The Very Excellent Mr. Dundee (2020) - Director, Writer, Producer

References

External links

Interview from 2000 on The Movie Show

1970 births
Australian screenwriters
Living people